The Decoration for Meritorious Services was an honour conferred until 1987 by the Government of the Republic of South Africa, usually for political services to the country. The appointments were made by the State President of South Africa.

Postnominal letters
The conferral of this honour entitles the holder to the use of 'DMS' in English after their names or 'DVD' in Afrikaans after their name.

It was superseded by the Order for Meritorious Service in 1986.

Since 1 June 1994, this honour is classified as a Commonwealth honour.

Design
A five-armed gold Maltese cross, displaying a golden protea flower on a blue roundel in the centre of a 5-pointed diamond-studded star, all superimposed on a multi-rayed silver and gold plaque (obverse). It is worn on a neck ribbon.

Selected recipients

References

050